Beltir (Beltir) is a rural locality (a selo) in Beltirskoye Rural Settlement of Kosh-Agachsky District, the Altai Republic, Russia. The population was 77 as of 2016. There are 10 streets.

Geography 
Beltir is located at the confluence of the rivers Chagan and Taldur, 43 km west of Kosh-Agach (the district's administrative centre) by road. Ortolyk is the nearest rural locality.

References 

Rural localities in Kosh-Agachsky District